Derek White  may refer to:

 Derek White (rugby union) (born 1958), Scottish former rugby union player
 Derek White (racing driver), NASCAR driver

See also
Derek Whyte (born 1968), former Scottish footballer
Derrick White (disambiguation)